Nobody Knows About Sex is a 2006 Russian comedy film directed by Aleksey Gordeev. Working title of the film was No One Knows About It. In 2008 a sequel was released Nobody Knows About Sex 2: No Sex starring Ksenia Sobchak).

Plot 
Throughout his life Egor lived in a remote taiga. All his knowledge of the world, he learned from the stories of his only relative - old grandfather-hunter. Once Egor accidentally meets TV presenter Angelina, he falls in love and decides to marry her, and so he goes to Moscow. However, he finds it difficult to get used to the pace of metropolitan life.

Cast
Nikolay Machulsky as Egor
 VJ Aurora as Angelina
 Anatoly Kuznetsov as  Grandpa  
 Kirill Kanahin as Kesha
 Elena Yakovleva as Kesha's mother 
  Mikhail Yefremov as Kesha's dad
 Aleksandr Bashirov as Stasik
 Anastasia Zadorozhnaya as Nika
 Andrey Kaykov as Alik
 Maria Gonchar as Anna

Release and criticism 
Gordeev's film was generally negatively assessed by both professional critics and ordinary viewers in Russia.

References

External links
  

Russian sex comedy films
2000s sex comedy films
Films set in Moscow
2000s Russian-language films